The Collingwood Monument is a Grade II* listed monument in Tynemouth, England, dedicated to Vice Admiral Lord Cuthbert Collingwood. A Napoleonic-era admiral noted for being second-in-command to Admiral Lord Nelson during the Battle of Trafalgar, Collingwood is sometimes referred to as the forgotten hero of Trafalgar. The monument's base is by John Dobson and the statue is a work of the sculptor John Graham Lough. It is situated just off Front Street in Tynemouth and overlooks the mouth of the River Tyne.

Background 
Lord Collingwood was born in Newcastle upon Tyne, the son of a merchant. He attended the Royal Grammar School and joined the Royal Navy as a volunteer at the age of 12. From there he continued his nautical education under his cousin Captain Richard Brathwaite. After serving in the British Naval Brigade at the Battle of Bunker Hill, Collingwood was commissioned in 1775 as a lieutenant. His first command was HMS Badger, after succeeding Horatio Nelson, and his first major command was HMS Sampson. Collingwood then led the fleet and completed the battle plans that he and Nelson had created together. For his role in the battle Collingwood was given the thanks of both houses of Parliament and awarded a pension of £2,000 per annum, as well as being promoted on 9 November 1805 to Vice-Admiral of the Red and raised to the peerage as Baron Collingwood, of Caldburne and Hethpool in the County of Northumberland.

In 1805 Collingwood was appointed to the Commander-in-Chief, Mediterranean Fleet. After requesting to be relieved of his command the Government stated that it urgently required an admiral of his calibre to lead against the dangers of the French and her allies, and that his country could therefore not dispense of him. However, in 1809 his health declined and he was granted leave. In 1810 Collingwood died of cancer on board  as he sailed for England. He was laid to rest beside Lord Nelson in St Paul's Cathedral. During his career he had served in the American Revolutionary War, the French Revolutionary Wars and the Napoleonic Wars, and had been awarded three Naval Gold Medals, making him one of only three people to share the distinction of earning a total of three.

The Monument 
The monument was erected to commemorate Collingwood and his connection to North Shields, and was deliberately positioned so that it could be seen from the Tyne. It was paid for by public subscription. The architect was John Dobson and John Graham Lough was responsible for the sculpture. The monument features a high wide base, with slit openings and a door in the rear. A flight of steps leads to the base of the plinth and side walls flank the steps. The statue of Collingwood stands upon this plinth and the is draped in a cloak over Collingwood's Royal Navy uniform. The figure's left  hand rests on a bollard wrapped in rope.

The monument was completed in 1845 except for the cannon, which were added in 1849.

The inscription on the plinth reads:

The monument is the scene of a murder in Season 11 of the TV series Vera.

Gallery

References 

Battle of Trafalgar
Buildings and structures completed in 1845
Grade II* listed buildings in Tyne and Wear
Grade II* listed monuments and memorials
Monuments and memorials in Tyne and Wear
Vera ITV 26/8/21